The Officers' Ward (French, La chambre des officiers), is a novel by Marc Dugain, published in 1998 (1999 in English).  It is supposedly based on the experiences of one of the author's own ancestors during World War I.

Synopsis
Adrien Fournier, a handsome lieutenant in the Engineers, is the narrator and main protagonist. Adrien is wounded on a simple reconnaissance mission on the first day of French involvement in the Great War. He is hit by a stray shell, which kills his fellow officers and his horse, and destroys the centre of Adrien's face. Devastated and permanently disfigured, he spends the rest of the war in a hospital, in a maxillofacial unit, with a small group of others who have similar injuries—including a woman, Marguerite, who has been wounded while nursing at the Western Front.  Adrien's palate and jaw are gradually reconstructed by pioneering plastic surgeons.

The novel follows the experiences of the group in the aftermath of the war and their subsequent lives, right up to World War II and beyond.

Reception
The novel won eighteen literary prizes and was made into a film in 2001, directed by François Dupeyron and starring Eric Caravaca as the central character.

References

1998 French novels
Novels set during World War I
French novels adapted into films
Medical novels
1998 debut novels